"Dancing in Berlin" is a song by American band Berlin, which was released in 1984 as the third single from their third studio album Love Life. It was written by John Crawford and produced by Giorgio Moroder and Richie Zito. It reached No. 12 in New Zealand and No. 39 in Australia.

Critical reception
Upon release, Billboard included the song as a recommended single under the "Pop" section. The Absolute Sound described the song as one of the best from Love Life. In a retrospective review of the album, Mike DeGagne of AllMusic commented that the song "emulates the same streamline formula of sharp keyboards and an animated dance pace" of "No More Words".

Track listing
7" single
"Dancing in Berlin" - 4:02
"Lost in the Crowd" - 4:38

7" single (US/Canada release)
"Dancing in Berlin" - 4:04
"Pictures of You" - 4:34

7" single (US promo)
"Dancing in Berlin" - 4:04
"Dancing in Berlin" - 4:04

12" single
"Dancing In Berlin (Dance Remix)" - 5:16
"Lost in the Crowd" - 4:38

Chart performance

Personnel
Berlin
 Terri Nunn – vocals
 Ric Olsen – guitar
 David Diamond – synthesizers, backing vocals
 Matt Reid – synthesizers
 John Crawford – bass, backing vocals
 Rob Brill – drums

Production
 Giorgio Moroder, Richie Zito - producers of "Dancing in Berlin"
 Mike Howlett - producer of "Lost in the Crowd" and "Pictures of You"

References

1984 singles
1984 songs
Berlin (band) songs
Geffen Records singles
Mercury Records singles
Song recordings produced by Giorgio Moroder
Song recordings produced by Richie Zito
Songs about Berlin